The 2015 Cheshire West and Chester Council election took place on 7 May 2015, electing members of Cheshire West and Chester Council in England. This was on the same day as other local elections across the country as well as the general election.

All 75 seats were contested. Labour won a small majority with a total of 38 seats on a 3.2% swing from the Conservatives, meaning that the council moved from Conservative control to Labour control.

Cheshire West and Chester was the only council to change hands in this way in the 2015 elections, and this unique result has been variously attributed to public dissatisfaction with fracking in the area, local planning issues, the organisation and leadership of the local parties, and to a generally difficult climate for Conservatives in the area. In addition, the only Liberal Democrat (Lib Dem) seat on the council was lost, while an independent was elected to the Parkgate ward. No other minor party won a seat, but both the Green Party and United Kingdom Independence Party (UKIP) fielded large numbers of candidates and saw significant positive swings. Labour's Samantha Dixon became the first woman to lead the council, while the previous leader Mike Jones survived a Conservative leadership challenge and became Leader of the Opposition.

Background

Cheshire West and Chester (CWaC) had been governed since its formation in 2009 by the Conservative Party. However, the Conservatives lost seats in CWaC against the national trend at the 2011 local election, and the Chester area was identified by The Economist before the election as a challenging area for the party. The election also took place at an especially bad period nationally for the Liberal Democrats, who lost 310 councillors in England at the previous local elections, and at a period of growth for other minor parties – especially UKIP, who won the CWaC council area in the 2014 European Parliament elections and were identified by the BBC as potential spoiler candidates. Although there were several by-elections in the 2011-2015 term, the number of councillors representing each party did not change over the course of the Council.

In total, there were 75 Conservative candidates, 75 Labour candidates, 45 Green candidates, 43 Liberal Democrat candidates, 33 UKIP candidates, 4 TUSC candidates, 1 Socialist Labour candidate and 9 candidates running as independents. Of the incumbents, 14 did not seek re-election, including several parliamentary candidates: Bob Thompson, formerly the only Lib Dem on the council, stood for Parliament in City of Chester; the former Labour councillor Julia Tickridge stood in Weaver Vale; and Justin Madders, previous leader of the Labour group, stood in and was elected to Ellesmere Port and Neston.

Election proceedings

The Statement of Persons Nominated was published on Friday 10 April 2015. The election took place on 7 May 2015, on the same day as the general election, various parish council elections, town council elections in Frodsham, Neston, Northwich and Winsford, and a referendum on town planning in Malpas. As is standard for council elections in England, first-past-the-post voting was used in single seat wards, and block voting was used in multi-seat wards. All 75 seats on the CWaC council were up for election. Of around 34,000 postal ballots issued, about 1,300 papers for Frodsham and the Garden Quarter district of Chester were voided and re-issued due to a printing error that removed the party emblems of some candidates, and 284 were not delivered in time for the election. An attack leaflet targeted at Labour leader Samantha Dixon was distributed to Chester city centre residents on the day of the election which lacked printing details and may have contained "incorrect information", in violation of the Representation of the People Act 1983. Cheshire Police confirmed that they were investigating the leaflet.

The count for the parliamentary election to City of Chester took priority, and so the count for CWaC began on at 2 PM, 8 May. The count took place at Northgate Arena, and ended up running through the whole of the allotted 9-hour day without a decisive result. The count was suspended on a "cliffhanger", with Labour and the Conservatives tied at 36 seats each after a recount was called on the two decisive two-seat ward of Newton. The count resumed on 9 May, and after a quick "bundle recount" suggested a Labour lead, the Conservative Party asked for a full recount, lasting another three and a half hours. The second recount revealed that Labour's Gill Watson led by 34 votes over the incumbent Adrian Walmsley in the final seat. The final result was delivered at 5.30 PM on 9 May 2015 after 14 hours of counting.

The final results saw the Conservatives retain the largest share of the popular vote, but with a smaller proportion than at the previous election. Labour gained 6 seats (5 from Conservative, 1 from Lib Dem), the Conservatives lost 6 seats (5 to Labour, 1 to independent) and the Lib Dems lost their only seat in Hoole to Labour. Labour therefore won an absolute majority, with 38 seats to the Conservatives 36 on the 75 seat council. This made CWaC the only council in the entire country to transfer from Conservative to Labour control at the 2015 elections, a result that was described by ConservativeHome as a "catastrophic loss" and by the Chester Chronicle as "deeply embarrassing" for the local Conservative Party.

No minor parties won any seats, but UKIP and the Greens saw large positive swings both across the borough and in individual wards, including a 9% swing to UKIP in Blacon and a 17.5% swing to the Greens in Garden Quarter, where they finished second.

|- style="text-align:center; background-color:#F2F2F2;"
! style="border: 1px solid #aaa;" colspan=2 | Political party
! style="border: 1px solid #aaa;" | Group leader
! style="border: 1px solid #aaa;" | Candidates
! style="border: 1px solid #aaa;" | Total votes
! style="border: 1px solid #aaa;" | Total seats
! style="border: 1px solid #aaa;" | Seats gained
! style="border: 1px solid #aaa;" | Seats lost
! style="border: 1px solid #aaa;" | Seats, net change
! style="border: 1px solid #aaa;" | Seats, of total (%)
! style="border: 1px solid #aaa;" | Votes, of total (%)
! style="border: 1px solid #aaa;" | Total votes, change (%)
|-
| data-sort-value="Conservative Party (UK)" 
| style="border: 1px solid #aaa; text-align: left;" scope="row" | 
| style="border: 1px solid #aaa; text-align: left;" | Mike Jones
| style="border: 1px solid #aaa;" | 75
| style="border: 1px solid #aaa;" | 68,580
| style="border: 1px solid #aaa;" | 36
| style="border: 1px solid #aaa;" | 0
| style="border: 1px solid #aaa;" | 6
| style="border: 1px solid #aaa;" |  6
| style="border: 1px solid #aaa;" | 48.0
| style="border: 1px solid #aaa;" | 36.7
| style="border: 1px solid #aaa;" |  7.5
|-
| data-sort-value="Labour Party (UK)" 
| style="border: 1px solid #aaa; text-align: left;" scope="row" | 
| style="border: 1px solid #aaa; text-align: left;" | Samantha Dixon
| style="border: 1px solid #aaa;" | 75
| style="border: 1px solid #aaa;" | 64,996
| style="border: 1px solid #aaa;" | 38
| style="border: 1px solid #aaa;" | 6
| style="border: 1px solid #aaa;" | 0
| style="border: 1px solid #aaa;" |  6
| style="border: 1px solid #aaa;" | 50.7
| style="border: 1px solid #aaa;" | 34.7
| style="border: 1px solid #aaa;" |  0.6
|-
| data-sort-value="Liberal Democrats (UK)" 
| style="border: 1px solid #aaa; text-align: left;" scope="row" | 
| style="border: 1px solid #aaa; text-align: left;" | Bob Thompson
| style="border: 1px solid #aaa;" | 43
| style="border: 1px solid #aaa;" | 18,273
| style="border: 1px solid #aaa;" | 0
| style="border: 1px solid #aaa;" | 0
| style="border: 1px solid #aaa;" | 1
| style="border: 1px solid #aaa;" |  1
| style="border: 1px solid #aaa;" | 0.0
| style="border: 1px solid #aaa;" | 9.8
| style="border: 1px solid #aaa;" |  3.5
|-
| data-sort-value="United Kingdom Independence Party" 
| style="border: 1px solid #aaa; text-align: left;" scope="row" | 
| style="border: 1px solid #aaa; text-align: left;" 
| style="border: 1px solid #aaa;" | 33
| style="border: 1px solid #aaa;" | 17,240
| style="border: 1px solid #aaa;" | 0
| style="border: 1px solid #aaa;" | 0
| style="border: 1px solid #aaa;" | 0
| style="border: 1px solid #aaa;" | 
| style="border: 1px solid #aaa;" | 0.0
| style="border: 1px solid #aaa;" | 9.2
| style="border: 1px solid #aaa;" |  7.3
|-
| data-sort-value="Green Party of England and Wales" 
| style="border: 1px solid #aaa; text-align: left;" scope="row" | 
| style="border: 1px solid #aaa; text-align: left;" 
| style="border: 1px solid #aaa;" | 45
| style="border: 1px solid #aaa;" | 11,867
| style="border: 1px solid #aaa;" | 0
| style="border: 1px solid #aaa;" | 0
| style="border: 1px solid #aaa;" | 0
| style="border: 1px solid #aaa;" | 
| style="border: 1px solid #aaa;" | 0.0
| style="border: 1px solid #aaa;" | 6.3
| style="border: 1px solid #aaa;" |  5.4
|-
| data-sort-value="Independent" 
| style="border: 1px solid #aaa; text-align: left;" scope="row" | Independent
| style="border: 1px solid #aaa; text-align: left;" 
| style="border: 1px solid #aaa;" | 9
| style="border: 1px solid #aaa;" | 5,627
| style="border: 1px solid #aaa;" | 1
| style="border: 1px solid #aaa;" | 1
| style="border: 1px solid #aaa;" | 0
| style="border: 1px solid #aaa;" |  1
| style="border: 1px solid #aaa;" | 1.3
| style="border: 1px solid #aaa;" | 3.0
| style="border: 1px solid #aaa;" |  1.0
|-
| data-sort-value="Socialist Labour Party (UK)" 
| style="border: 1px solid #aaa; text-align: left;" scope="row" | 
| style="border: 1px solid #aaa; text-align: left;" 
| style="border: 1px solid #aaa;" | 1
| style="border: 1px solid #aaa;" | 286
| style="border: 1px solid #aaa;" | 0
| style="border: 1px solid #aaa;" | 0
| style="border: 1px solid #aaa;" | 0
| style="border: 1px solid #aaa;" | 
| style="border: 1px solid #aaa;" | 0.0
| style="border: 1px solid #aaa;" | 0.2
| style="border: 1px solid #aaa;" | 
|-
| data-sort-value="Trade Unionist and Socialist Coalition" 
| style="border: 1px solid #aaa; text-align: left;" scope="row" | 
| style="border: 1px solid #aaa; text-align: left;" 
| style="border: 1px solid #aaa;" | 4
| style="border: 1px solid #aaa;" | 184
| style="border: 1px solid #aaa;" | 0
| style="border: 1px solid #aaa;" | 0
| style="border: 1px solid #aaa;" | 0
| style="border: 1px solid #aaa;" | 
| style="border: 1px solid #aaa;" | 0.0
| style="border: 1px solid #aaa;" | 0.1
| style="border: 1px solid #aaa;" 
|- class="unsortable" style="background-color:#F2F2F2
! style="border: 1px solid #aaa;" colspan=3 | Total
! style="border: 1px solid #aaa;" | 285
! style="border: 1px solid #aaa;" | 187,053
! style="border: 1px solid #aaa;" | 75
! style="border: 1px solid #aaa;" | -
! style="border: 1px solid #aaa;" | -
! style="border: 1px solid #aaa;" | -
! style="border: 1px solid #aaa;" | Turnout
! style="border: 1px solid #aaa;" | 68.2
! style="border: 1px solid #aaa;" | -
|}

Seat composition between 2011 (top) and 2015 (bottom):

In all, there were 22 new councillors to CWaC council – 12 from Labour, 9 from the Conservatives and one independent. Local Labour leader Samantha Dixon became the council leader, making her the first woman to hold the role, while former council leader Mike Jones remained leader of the Conservative group despite a leadership challenge.

Following the election, the first council meeting under Labour control took place on 21 May 2015. The new administration significantly restructured the council: the existing scrutiny committees were merged while new local committees were established for Chester, Ellesmere Port, Northwich and Winsford, and rural Cheshire, and the roles of Lord Mayor of Chester and Chair of the Council were separated. This meant that the casting vote remained with former Lord Mayor, Bob Rudd (Labour), instead of the new Lord Mayor, Hugo Deynem (Conservative), which Conservatives criticized for politicizing the role. The new overview and scrutiny committee was arranged on a nonpartisan basis, with equal numbers of Labour and Conservative members and the casting vote given to the independent Martin Barker.

Reactions and analysis

As leader of the only Labour group to take control of a former Conservative council at the elections, Samantha Dixon described her local party as "a little ray of hope in the North West" but warned that it would be difficult to operate Labour policies under a national Conservative majority government, and proposed a more consensual cross-party approach to running the council. The outgoing Conservative leader, Mike Jones, suggested that a Labour majority of just one would decrease private sector confidence in the council.

Fracking was noted by both the Chester Chronicle and BBC News as a politically hot topic in Cheshire, particularly around Upton where one gas company had planning permission for a drilling site, and the Conservative loss was partly attributed to community fears about the practice. Matt Bryan, an anti-fracking Labour candidate in Upton unseated the sitting Conservative councillor in what the Chester Chronicle described as arguably "the biggest poll shock". The Labour MP for City of Chester, Chris Matheson, who had similarly defeated the incumbent Stephen Mosley against the national trend, described unhappiness with fracking planning permission procedures and planning more generally as key issues that had helped Labour locally.

The loss of the safe Conservative seat of Parkgate to the independent Martin Barker was also described as a "surprise" by AboutMyArea. Barker stood on a platform of localism for Parkgate and his victory was attributed by the site to dissatisfaction with the choice of Conservative candidate, who lived outside Parkgate in Mickle Trafford.

On taking office, Dixon credited the result to a "positive campaign" by the Labour Party rather than any mistakes by the Conservative Party. However, Private Eyes "Rotten Boroughs" column blamed "own goals" by Jones – such as removing the planning committee chairperson and withdrawing the party whip from councillors who voted against developments that Jones supported, insulting members of the public, and removing a respect clause from the council constitution – for having "handed victory to Labour". There was similar criticism from ConservativeHome, whose correspondent accused Jones of behaving "in a way which allowed our opponents to paint us as dodgy, or even corrupt", and from councillor Mark Stocks, who launched an unsuccessful leadership challenge against Jones, saying:
"As the only council in the entire country to make the transition from Conservative to Labour, someone has to take the responsibility for what must be considered a monumental defeat. This responsibility has to start at the top. For me, it is an unavoidable belief that with proper leadership, Cheshire West and Chester would have followed the national trend and remained under Conservative control."

Jones, supported by other Conservative councillors, rejected this suggestion, noting the fact that the local Conservative Party had taken the largest share of the popular vote at the council election and retained the parliamentary seat of Weaver Vale against opinion poll predictions. When looked at this way, Jones said, the result "does not seem like a catastrophe".

Results

Councillor changes

New councillors
Val Armstrong (Labour, Witton)
Martin Barker (Independent, Parkgate)
Michael Baynham (Conservative, Winsford Over and Verdin)
Richard Beacham (Labour, Newton)
Robert Bisset (Labour, St Paul's)
Matt Bryan (Labour, Upton)
Angie Chidley (Labour, Hoole)
Jess Crook (Labour, Ellesmere Port Town)
Carol Gahan (Labour, Blacon)
Lynn Gibbon (Conservative, Marbury)
Nige Jones (Conservative, Little Neston and Burton)
Susan Kaur (Conservative, Hartford and Greenbank)
Jane Mercer (Labour, Lache)
Patricia Parkes (Conservative, Hartford and Greenbank)
James Pearson (Conservative, Davenham and Moulton)
Peter Rooney (Labour, Ledsham and Manor)
Karen Shore (Labour, Whitby)
Stephen Smith (Labour, Elton)
Harry Tonge (Conservative, Weaver and Cuddington)
Gill Watson (Labour, Newton)
Chris Whitehurst (Conservative, Malpas)
Paul Williams (Conservative, Weaver and Cuddington)

Outgoing councillors
Keith Butcher (Labour)
Malcolm Byram (Conservative)
Robert Crompton (Conservative)
Brenda Dowding (Conservative)
Les Ford (Conservative)
Carolyn Graham (Labour)
John Grimshaw (Conservative)
Graham Heatley (Conservative)
Mark Henesy (Labour)
Lynda Jones (Conservative)
Kay Loch (Conservative)
Justin Madders (Labour)
Herbert Manley (Conservative)
Hilarie McNae (Conservative)
Keith Musgrave (Conservative)
Tom Parry (Conservative)
Ben Powell (Labour)
Alexandra Tate (Labour)
Bob Thompson (Liberal Democrat)
Julia Tickridge (Labour)
Adrian Walmsley (Conservative)
Elton Watson (Conservative)
Ann Wright (Conservative)

Re-elected councillors
Gareth Anderson (Conservative, Ledsham and Monor)
David Armstrong (Labour, Winsford Swanlow and Deane)
Don Beckett (Labour, Winsford Over and Verdin)
Alex Black (Labour, Hoole)
Tom Blackmore (Labour, Winsford Over and Verdin)
Keith Board (Conservative, Great Boughton)
Pamela Booher (Labour, Winsford Wharton)
Stephen Burns (Labour, Winsford Swanlow and Deane)
Lynn Clare (Labour, Ellesmere Port Town)
Brian Clarke (Labour, Winsford Wharton)
Angela Claydon (Labour, St Paul's)
Brian Crowe (Conservative, Saughall and Mollington)
Razia Daniels (Conservative, Handbridge Park)
Andrew Dawson (Conservative, Frodsham)
Martyn Delaney (Labour, Boughton)
Hugo Deynem (Conservative, Tarvin and Kelsall)
Samantha Dixon (Labour, Chester City)
Paul Dolan (Labour, Winnington and Castle)
Paul Donovan (Labour, Sutton)
Charles Fifield (Conservative, Weaver and Cuddington)
Howard Greenwood (Conservative, Farndon)
Louise Gittins (Labour, Little Neston and Burton)
Pamela Hall (Conservative, Great Boughton)
Don Hammond (Conservative, Marbury)
Myles Hogg (Conservative, Willaston and Thornton)
Jill Houlbrook (Conservative, Upton)
Eleanor Johnson (Conservative, Gowy)
Brian Jones (Labour, Whitby)
Mike Jones (Conservative, Tattenhall)
Reggie Jones (Labour, Blacon)
Tony Lawrenson (Labour, Witton)
John Leather (Conservative, Tarvin and Kelsall)
Alan McKie (Conservative, Helsby)
Nicole Meardon (Labour, Sutton)
Pat Merrick (Labour, Rossmore)
Eveleigh Moore Dutton (Conservative, Tarporley)
Sam Naylor (Labour, Winnington and Castle)
Marie Nelson (Labour, Blacon)
Ralph Oultram (Conservative, Kingsley)
Margaret Parker (Conservative, Chester Villages)
Stuart Parker (Conservative, Chester Villages)
Lynn Riley (Conservative, Frodsham)
Diane Roberts (Labour, Netherpool)
Bob Rudd (Labour, Garden Quarter)
Tony Sherlock (Labour, Grange)
Gaynor Sinar (Conservative, Davenham and Moulton)
Mark Stocks (Conservative, Shakerley)
Neil Sullivan (Conservative, Handbridge Park)
Helen Weltman (Conservative, Davenham and Moulton)
Andrew Williams (Labour, Neston)
Mark Williams (Conservative, Dodleston and Huntington)
Norman Wright (Conservative, Marbury)

Seat changes

 Conservative to Independent (1)
Parkgate

 Conservative to Labour (5)
Elton
Newton (2 seats)
Upton (1 seat)
Whitby (1 seat)

 Liberal Democrat to Labour (1)
Hoole (1 seat)

Results by ward

Blacon

Boughton

Chester City

Chester Villages

Davenham and Moulton

Dodleston and Huntington

Ellesmere Port Town

Elton

Farndon

Frodsham

Garden Quarter

Gowy

Grange

Great Boughton

Handbridge Park

Hartford and Greenbank

Helsby

Hoole

Kingsley

Lache

Ledsham and Manor

Little Neston and Burton

Malpas

Marbury

Neston

Netherpool

Newton

Parkgate

Rossmore

Saughall and Mollington

Shakerley

St Paul's

Strawberry

Sutton

Tarporley

Tarvin and Kelsall

Tattenhall

Upton

Weaver and Cuddington

Whitby

Willaston and Thornton

Winnington and Castle

Winsford Over and Verdin

Winsford Swanlow and Dene

Winsford Wharton

Witton

Changes between 2015 and 2019

Ellesmere Port Town by-election 2018

Labour councillor Lynn Clare (Ellesmere Port Town) died in February 2018. The by-election was held on 3 May. This was on the same day as other local elections.

Footnotes

References

External links
 Borough election details, Cheshire West Elections 2015
 Election 2015, Cheshire West and Chester Council

2015 English local elections
May 2015 events in the United Kingdom
2015
2010s in Cheshire
Anti-fracking movement